Crowley Lake is a census-designated place in Mono County, California. The 2020 United States census reported Crowley Lake's population was 980.

Geography
According to the United States Census Bureau, the CDP covers an area of 2.8 square miles (7.3 km2), 99.45% of it land and 0.55% of it water.

Demographics

The 2010 United States Census reported that Crowley Lake had a population of 875. The racial makeup of Crowley Lake was 769 (87.9%) White, 4 (0.5%) African American, 6 (0.7%) Native American, 11 (1.3%) Asian, 0 (0.0%) Pacific Islander, 60 (6.9%) from other races, and 25 (2.9%) from two or more races. Hispanic or Latino of any race were 128 persons (14.6%).

The Census reported that 871 people (99.5% of the population) lived in households, 4 (0.5%) lived in non-institutionalized group quarters, and 0 (0%) were institutionalized.

There were 367 households, out of which 122 (33.2%) had children under the age of 18 living in them, 211 (57.5%) were opposite-sex married couples living together, 24 (6.5%) had a female householder with no husband present, 16 (4.4%) had a male householder with no wife present.  There were 17 (4.6%) unmarried opposite-sex partnerships, and 3 (0.8%) same-sex married couples or partnerships. 99 households (27.0%) were made up of individuals, and 11 (3.0%) had someone living alone who was 65 years of age or older. The average household size was 2.37.  There were 251 families (68.4% of all households); the average family size was 2.88.

The population was spread out, with 210 people (24.0%) under the age of 18, 46 people (5.3%) aged 18 to 24, 180 people (20.6%) aged 25 to 44, 388 people (44.3%) aged 45 to 64, and 51 people (5.8%) who were 65 years of age or older.  The median age was 45.1 years. For every 100 females, there were 108.3 males.  For every 100 females age 18 and over, there were 108.5 males.

The homeowner vacancy rate was 3.0%; the rental vacancy rate was 12.0%.  737 people (84.2% of the population) lived in owner-occupied housing units and 134 people (15.3%) lived in rental housing units.

See also

 List of census-designated places in California

References

External links

Census-designated places in Mono County, California
Census-designated places in California